The Amicable Grant was a tax imposed on England in 1525 by the Lord Chancellor Thomas Wolsey. Called at the time "a benevolence", it was essentially a forced loan, a levy of between one sixth and one tenth on the goods of the laity and on one-third of the goods of the clergy. The Amicable Grant should have been levied with Parliamentary authority, but was not, and so the legal framework for its collection was extremely weak. This was partly because it was brought to Parliament by Thomas Wolsey, who was becoming increasingly unpopular.  Widespread passive resistance, with a growing threat of armed resistance,  meant little money was raised and the project was dropped. King Henry VIII now lacked funds for his war in France and made peace.

Causes
Henry VIII of England had long wanted to claim territory in France. The King of England had first invaded France in a conquest that lasted from 1511-1514.  Through this campaign, Henry would spend £650,000. This was obviously a great amount of money and dealt a big blow to his treasury. Despite having lost so much money, in 1525 Henry wanted to mount another invasion of France (the Great Enterprise) since the King of France, Francis I, had been captured by Holy Roman Emperor Charles V at the Battle of Pavia in 1525. Henry required additional funds of £800,000, so to gain said money Wolsey resorted to the Amicable Grant.  The English Parliament was at this time unlikely to support war, since it was proving to be expensive. Furthermore, Henry's previous French endeavours, which had occurred in 1522 and 1523, had proved less than successful.

Effects

Short term
Trouble was inevitable and indeed, even anticipated, for the Commons were financially exhausted; the forced 'loans' of 1522–1523 had not been repaid and the subsidy of 1523 was still being collected. Archbishop Warham reported on 12 April that he found the Kentish clergy 'not inclined to the grant' and that the heads of the religious houses had answered 'that they cannot contribute as required'. At Ely they said they would gladly sell their cattle and goods 'but no man in the country has money to buy or lend'. Discontent reached dangerous levels across England. In Essex, Kent, Norfolk, Warwickshire, and Huntingdonshire, the grant provoked reactions ranging from reluctance to outright refusal. It provoked an open rebellion in Suffolk and a taxpayer strike, which spread to the borders of Essex and Cambridgeshire. In the most serious rebellion in England since 1497, 10,000 men converged on the major trading town of Lavenham. An eyewitness reported that the militants only failed because loyal townsmen led by Sir John Spring had removed the clappers from the bells of Lavenham church, which were to have been rung to signal the start of the uprising. 

The rebellion was eventually crushed by the Dukes of Norfolk and Suffolk, but the rebels had made their point. Wolsey was forced to abandon the Grant and reduce the payments for the 1523 subsidy. Discontent in London prompted Henry to halve demands to save some of the tax, before abandoning it altogether. At the end of May, the rising's ringleaders were brought before the Star Chamber and pardoned. Wolsey led an ostentatious ceremony of reconciliation, begging the king for pardon for his fellow Suffolk men, even supplying them with more than enough cash to cover their time in gold and a piece of silver.

Long term
Wolsey's climbdown was humiliating, and may have contributed to his fall in 1529 since this was the first occasion in which Wolsey had seriously failed to enact Henry's will. Popular opinion made a significant impact on foreign policy too, reducing considerably the fiscal potential of the Henrician government and forcing Henry to abandon his European schemes; peace with France was the only course, ending significant military endeavours for England until the Scottish campaign of 1542.

References

Further reading
 Bernard, George William. War, Taxation, and Rebellion in Early Tudor England: Henry VIII, Wolsey, and the Amicable Grant of 1525 (Palgrave Macmillan, 1986).
 Bernard, G. W., and Richard W. Hoyle. "The instructions for the levying of the Amicable Grant, March 1525." Historical Research 67.163 (1994): 190-202.
History of taxation in the United Kingdom
1525 in England